The Codex Speculum or Speculum Ps-Augustine, designated by m, is a 5th-century Latin manuscript of the New Testament. The text, written on vellum, is a version of the old Latin. The manuscript contains passages from all the books of the New Testament except 3 John, Hebrews, and Philemon on 154 parchment leaves. It also has a citation from the Epistle to the Laodiceans.

The Latin text of the codex is a representative of the Western text-type in itala recension.

The text of the manuscript was published by Cardinal Mai in 1843.

Currently it is housed at the Saint Cross monastery (Sessorianus) in Rome.

See also  
 List of New Testament Latin manuscripts
 Codex Corbeiensis I

Notes

References 

Vetus Latina New Testament manuscripts

5th-century biblical manuscripts